Caloptilia umbratella is a moth of the family Gracillariidae. It is known from Ontario and Québec in Canada and Kentucky and Virginia in the United States.

There are probably two generations per year.

The larvae feed on Acer rubrum and Acer saccharum. They mine the leaves of their host plant. The mine has the form of a short linear mine terminating in a small flat blotch, in which the parenchyma is consumed.

References

External links
Caloptilia at microleps.org
mothphotographersgroup

umbratella
Moths of North America
Moths described in 1927